The 2016 Sepang GP3 Series round was a GP3 Series motor race held on 1 and 2 October 2016 at the Sepang International Circuit in Malaysia. It was the penultimate round of the 2016 GP3 Series. The race weekend supported the 2016 Malaysian Grand Prix.

Background
Alessio Lorandi made his debut for the Jenzer Motorsport outfit.

Classification

Qualifying

Notes
  – Álex Palou was excluded from qualifying after his underfloor was found to be below the required dimensions. He would start the race from the back of the grid.

Race 1

Race 2

Standings after the round

Drivers' Championship standings

Teams' Championship standings

 Note: Only the top five positions are included for both sets of standings.

See also 
 2016 Malaysian Grand Prix
 2016 Sepang GP2 Series round

References

External links 
 Official website of GP3 Series

|- style="text-align:center"
|width="35%"|Previous race:
|width="30%"|GP3 Series2016 season
|width="40%"|Next race:

GP3
October 2016 sports events in Asia
2016 GP3 round reports